Thiago Gomes (born 11 January 1979) is a Brazilian rower. He competed at the 2004 Summer Olympics and the 2008 Summer Olympics.

References

External links
 

1979 births
Living people
Brazilian male rowers
Olympic rowers of Brazil
Rowers at the 2004 Summer Olympics
Rowers at the 2008 Summer Olympics
Rowers from Rio de Janeiro (city)
Pan American Games medalists in rowing
Pan American Games silver medalists for Brazil
Rowers at the 2003 Pan American Games
Medalists at the 2003 Pan American Games